Céreste (Occitan: Ceirèsta) is a commune in the Alpes-de-Haute-Provence department in southeastern France. It is known for its rich fossil beds in fine layers of "Calcaire de Campagne Calavon" limestone, which are now protected by the Parc naturel régional du Luberon and the Réserve naturelle géologique du Luberon.

Geography
The river Calavon forms the commune's northern and northwestern borders.

History
A Gallo-Roman period settlement was established in the quarter of today's Saint-Sauveur priory, possibly as a crossing control point for the river.   Surviving relics of the Roman period include a potters' oven, an ancient tomb and Sarcophagi at Saint-Sauveur.

The Priory of Carluc was founded in the eleventh century.  Another priory, that of Saint-Sauveur-Au-Pont, belonged during the twelfth and thirteenth century to the Abbey of Saint Andrew at Villeneuve-lès-Avignon. The fiefdom was held initially by the Forcalquiers, and later by the Brancas family.

By the start of the eighteenth century, the Estieu brothers were running a pottery oven.

During the revolution the commune had its own Patriotic Society, a variation on the Jacobin Club theme, created in this case soon after 1792.

Population

See also
 Luberon
Communes of the Alpes-de-Haute-Provence department

References

Communes of Alpes-de-Haute-Provence
Alpes-de-Haute-Provence communes articles needing translation from French Wikipedia